Josef Müllner (1 August 1879 in Baden near Vienna – 25. December 1968 in Vienna) was an Austrian sculptor, best known for his monumental sculptures such as the monument to Karl Lueger at Dr.-Karl-Lueger-Platz in Vienna. His work was part of the sculpture event in the art competition at the 1936 Summer Olympics. His students included, among others, Rudolf Schmidt and Bruno Zach.

References

External links 
 

Austrian sculptors
Austrian male sculptors
1879 births
1968 deaths
Olympic competitors in art competitions